Hart Sheik is a town located in eastern Ethiopia, in the Somali Region.

Demographics 
According to the 2022 census conducted by the Central Statistical Agency of Ethiopia (CSA) Hart Sheik had a population of 20,000.

Notes

External links
 Ethiopia's children dying from malnutrition - UNICEF.org
 A satellite map of Hartishek - Indexmundi.com

Populated places in the Somali Region
Refugee camps in Africa